Raja Awadhesh Singh (died 1933) was zamindar of Kalakankar estate of Oudh of British India, succeeded by Raja Ramesh Singh.

On 14 November 1929, Raja Awadhesh Singh met Mahatma Gandhi during his visit of Kalakankar. Kunwar Suresh Singh was his elder brother who was close to poet Sumitranandan Pant as well as associated with Mahatma Gandhi and took active participation in Gandhi's movement.

His son Raja Dinesh Singh served as minister of external affair in prime minister Indira Gandhi’s cabinet.

Raja Awadhesh (Avadesh) Singh Memorial Educational Society is named after him, its vice-president is his grand daughter Ratna Singh.

See also 
 Pratapgarh Estate

References 

1848 births
1933 deaths
Indian Hindus
People from Pratapgarh, Uttar Pradesh
Indian independence activists from Uttar Pradesh
Gandhians